Valentin Stepankov (born 1951) was the first prosecutor general of the Russian Federation.

He once condemned an action by Boris Yeltsin in 1993, in which Russia faced a constitutional crisis.  

He has also served as Russia's deputy natural resources minister.  Before that he was deputy secretary on the Security Council, but in 2004 he switched from the Council to natural resources administration.

References

Russian jurists
1951 births
People from Perm, Russia
Perm State University alumni
Living people
General Prosecutors of Russia
20th-century Russian lawyers
21st-century Russian lawyers
Second convocation members of the State Duma (Russian Federation)